LÉ Emer (P21) of the Irish Naval Service, now known as NNS Prosperity of the Nigerian Navy, was built as a patrol vessel in Verolme Dockyard, Cork, Ireland in 1977.

After evaluating  for 3 years, Emer was ordered by the Irish Naval Service in 1975. Commissioned in January 1978, she was named after Emer, the principal wife of Cúchulainn, a legendary Irish folk hero.

She was commissioned on 16 January 1978 and had 35 years of service with the Irish Naval Service.

Decommissioned on 20 September 2013, in October 2013 Emer was sold at auction for €320,000 to a Nigerian businessman.

In July 2014 Emer was impounded by the Nigerian Navy because the new owner had failed to secure the necessary military approval before bringing the ship into Nigerian waters. On 19 February 2015 Emer was commissioned into the Nigerian Navy as a training ship and renamed NNS Prosperity.

References

1977 ships
Former naval ships of the Republic of Ireland
Deirdre-class offshore patrol vessels
Naval ships of Nigeria
Ships built in Ireland